Õnne Kurg (born 8 March 1973) is an Estonian cross-country skier. She competed in four events at the 1998 Winter Olympics.

Cross-country skiing results
All results are sourced from the International Ski Federation (FIS).

Olympic Games

World Championships

World Cup

Season standings

References

External links
 

1973 births
Living people
People from Väike-Maarja Parish
Estonian female cross-country skiers
Olympic cross-country skiers of Estonia
Cross-country skiers at the 1998 Winter Olympics